TruenoTierra is the seventh studio album by Argentine hard rock band La Renga, released on December 12, 2006. It was the first studio double album released by the band.

The first disc, called Trueno (Thunder), contains 12 tracks, including the single "'Oscuro Diamante". The second disc, called Tierra (Earth), contains 5 instrumental tracks taken from jam sessions.

Track listing

Disc one: Trueno
"El Monstruo que Crece"
"Almohada de Piedra"
"Ruta 40"
"La Boca del Lobo"
"Montaña Roja"
"Palabras Estorbantes"
"Cualquier Historia"
"Mujer del Caleidoscopio"
"Llenado de Llorar"
"Oscuro Diamante"
"Entre la Niebla"
"Cuadrado Obviado"

Disc two: Tierra
"Alunizando al Unisono"
"Sustancia Entre las Plantas"
"TruenoTierra"
"Anaximandro"
"Neuronas Abrazadas"

Personnel 
Chizzo - lead vocals, lead guitar
Teté - bass guitar
Tanque - drums, percussion
Chiflo - saxophone
Manu - rhythm guitar, saxophone, backing vocals

Guest musicians 
Leopoldo Janin - tenor and baritone saxophone (tracks 4 and 12, disc 1)
Juan Cruz Fernández - trumpet (tracks 4 and 12, disc 1)

Additional personnel
Alvaro Villagra - mastering
Alejandro Russo - assistant engineer
Jorge Leggio - assistant engineer
Alberto Miglioranza - recording technical

La Renga albums
2006 albums